Lost Creek station is a historic railroad depot located at Lost Creek, Harrison County, West Virginia.  It was built in 1892 by the Baltimore and Ohio Railroad, and is a one-story, Folk Victorian frame building with board-and-batten siding. It measures . In 1923, it was the largest cattle shipping point east of the Mississippi River.

It was listed on the National Register of Historic Places in 2005 as the Lost Creek Baltimore and Ohio Railroad Depot.

References

Railway stations on the National Register of Historic Places in West Virginia
Buildings and structures in Harrison County, West Virginia
Former Baltimore and Ohio Railroad stations
National Register of Historic Places in Harrison County, West Virginia
Railway stations in the United States opened in 1892
Victorian architecture in West Virginia
Folk Victorian architecture in the United States
Former railway stations in West Virginia